The Federação Alagoana de Futebol (English: Football Association of Alagoas state) was founded on March 14, 1927, and it manages all the official football tournaments within the state of Alagoas, which are the Campeonato Alagoano and the Campeonato Alagoano lower levels, and represents the clubs at the Brazilian Football Confederation (CBF).

References

Alagoana
Football in Alagoas
Sports organizations established in 1927